Gotta Travel On is an album by pianist Ray Bryant recorded and released by Cadet Records in 1966.

Track listing 
All compositions by Ray Bryant except where noted
 "Gotta Travel On" (Paul Clayton, Larry Ehrlich, Dave Lazer, Tom Six) – 4:27
 "Erewhon" – 3:10
 "Smack Dab in the Middle" (Chuck Calhoun) – 4:03
 "Monkey Business" – 2:52
 "All Things Are Possible" – 3:45
 "It Was a Very Good Year" (Ervin Drake) – 4:01
 "Bags' Groove" (Milt Jackson) – 5:31
 "Midnight Stalking" – 4:15
 "Little Soul Sister" – 5:21

Personnel 
Ray Bryant – piano
Snooky Young – trumpet (tracks 2, 5, 6 & 9), 
Clark Terry – trumpet, flugelhorn (tracks 2, 5, 6 & 9)
Walter Booker – bass
Freddie Waits – drums

References 

1966 albums
Ray Bryant albums
Cadet Records albums
Albums produced by Esmond Edwards